Cuterebra approximata is a species of new world skin bot fly in the family Oestridae. The larvae are typically parasites of Peromyscus maniculatus. Larvae typically go through three instars before emerging from the host to pupate in the morning. Adult flies also emerge from pupation in the morning.

References

Oestridae
Articles created by Qbugbot
Insects described in 1866
Diptera of North America